RYF may refer to:
 Raise Your Flag, a song for the homecoming of Miss Universe 2018 Catriona Gray, sung by KZ Tandingan ft. Kritiko
 Revolutionary Youth Front, an Indian socialist organization
 Respects Your Freedom hardware certification